Kenutu is a privately owned island of the coast of Vava'u Island that belongs to the Afuha’amango Family.

Owners
This island is owned by the Afuha'amango family. Afuha'amango was gifted the island as a token of appreciation from the King of Tonga after he led him to victory in his many battles across the kingdom. Currently, the island is uninhabited but locals from neighbouring islands visit Kenutu.

References

Islands of Tonga
Uninhabited islands of Tonga
Private islands of Oceania